Storvik is a locality situated in Sandviken Municipality, Gävleborg County, Sweden with 2,165 inhabitants in 2010.

Storvik was and still is an important railway junction for freight trains. Here the Northern Main Line, the Bergslagen Line and the goods route through Bergslagen meet up. 

Storvik once had the longest train platform in Europe.

References 

Populated places in Sandviken Municipality
Gästrikland